A fishing light attractor is a fishing aid that uses lighting devices attached to structure above water or suspended underwater to attract fish at night. This is taking advantage of the phototactic behaviour exhibited by many species of fish, who are either attracted by the light themselves, or have come to prey upon any phototactic invertebrates that are drawn by the light.

See also
Spotlighting

Fishing equipment
Articles containing video clips